In written languages, an ordinal indicator is a character, or group of characters, following a numeral denoting that it is an ordinal number, rather than a cardinal number. In English orthography, this corresponds to the suffixes -st, -nd, -rd, -th in written ordinals (represented either on the line 1st, 2nd, 3rd, 4th or as superscript).

Also commonly encountered are the superscript or superior (and often underlined) masculine ordinal indicator, and feminine ordinal indicator,  originally from Romance and then via the cultural influence of Italian, as in 1º primo and 1ª prima. In correct typography, the ordinal indicators  and  should be distinguishable from other characters.

The practice of underlined (or doubly underlined) superscripted abbreviations was common in 19th-century writing (not limited to ordinal indicators in particular, and also extant in the numero sign ), and was also found in handwritten English until at least the late 19th century (e.g. first abbreviated  or 1).

Usage
The indicator may be given an underline but this is not ubiquitous. In digital typography, this depends on the font: Cambria and Calibri, for example, have underlined ordinal indicators, while most other fonts do not.

Examples of the usage of ordinal indicators in Italian are:
;  ('first'), 
;  ('second')
;   ('third')

As with other abbreviations in Spanish, the ordinal numbers have a period ".", which is placed before the indicator. Portuguese follows the same method.

Origins

The practice of indicating ordinals with superscript suffixes may originate with the practice of writing a superscript o to indicate a Latin ablative in pre-modern scribal practice.

The usage of terminals in the vernacular languages of Europe derives from Latin usage, as practised by scribes in monasteries and chanceries before writing in the vernacular became established. The terminal letters used depend on the gender of the item to be ordered and the case in which the ordinal adjective is stated, for example  ('the first day', nominative case, masculine), but  ('on the first day', ablative case masculine), shown as Io or io. As monumental inscriptions often refer to days on which events happened, e.g. "he died on the tenth of June", the ablative case is generally used: Xo with the month stated in the genitive case. Examples:
Io , 'on the first day of July'
Xo 
XXo 
Lo 
Co 
Mo

Design

The masculine ordinal indicator  may be confused with the degree sign  (U+00B0), which looks very similar and which is provided on the Italian and Latin American keyboard layouts. It was common in the early days of computers to use the same character for both. The degree sign is a uniform circle and is never underlined. The masculine ordinal indicator is the shape of a lower-case letter , and thus may be oval or elliptical, and may have a varying line thickness.

Ordinal indicators may also be underlined. It is not mandatory in Portugal nor in Brazil, but it is preferred in some fonts to avoid confusion with the degree sign.

Also, the ordinal indicators should be distinguishable from superscript characters. The top of the ordinal indicators (i.e., the top of the elevated letter  and letter ) must be aligned with the cap height of the font. The alignment of the top of superscripted letters  and  will depend on the font.

The line thickness of the ordinal indicators is always proportional to the line thickness of the other characters of the font. Many fonts just shrink the characters (making them thinner) to draw superscripts.

Encoding
The Romance feminine and masculine ordinal indicators were adopted into 
the 8-bit ECMA-94 encoding in 1985 and the ISO 8859-1 encoding in 1987 (both based on DEC's Multinational Character Set designed for VT220), at positions 170 (xAA) and 186 (xBA), respectively. 
ISO 8859-1 was incorporated as the first 256 code points of ISO/IEC 10646 and Unicode in 1991. 
The Unicode characters are thus:
 
 

The majority of character sets intended to support Galician, Portuguese and/or Spanish have those two characters encoded. In detail (in hexadecimal):

Typing

On other keyboard layouts these characters are accessible only through a set of keystrokes. 

In MacOS keyboards,  can be obtained by pressing  and  can be obtained by pressing .

There appears to be no Compose key combinations for these characters, despite their commonality.

For this option to appear, the selected input language may need to be changed to one where these symbols are used natively. For example, on Microsoft Swiftkey, both are available when 'Italian' is enabled, but not when only 'English' is.

Similar conventions
Some languages use superior letters as a typographic convention for abbreviations. Some might say that this is a misuse of ordinal indicators:
The superscript characters and indicators are always preceded by a period. Traditionally they have been underlined, but this is optional and less frequent today. Portuguese forms some abbreviations in the same manner.
 English has borrowed the No. abbreviation from the Romance-language word , which itself derives from the Latin word , the ablative case of the word  ('number'). This is sometimes written as No, with the superscript o optionally underlined, or sometimes with the ordinal indicator.

Ordinal dot 
In Basque, Serbo-Croatian, Czech, Danish, Estonian, Faroese, Finnish, German, Hungarian, Icelandic, Latvian, Norwegian, Slovak, Slovene, Turkish, among other languages,  a period or full stop is written after the numeral. In Polish the period can be omitted if there is no ambiguity whether a given numeral is ordinal or cardinal. The only exceptions are variables in mathematics ( – ).
Writing out the endings for various cases, as sometimes happens in Czech and Slovak, is considered incorrect and uneducated. Should a period or full stop follow this dot, it is omitted. In Czech and Slovak, numerals with ordinal dot are mostly used only in tables, lists etc., or in case of large (or long) numbers; within a sentence it is recommended to write out the form with letters in full.

The Serbian standard of Serbo-Croatian (unlike the Croatian and Bosnian standards) uses the dot in role of the ordinal indicator only past Arabic numerals, while Roman numerals are used without a dot.

There is a problem with autocorrection, mobile editors, etc., which often force a capital initial letter in the word following the ordinal number.

Other suffixes

English 

 -st is used with numbers ending in 1 (e.g. 1st, pronounced first)
 -nd is used with numbers ending in 2 (e.g. 92nd, pronounced ninety-second)
 -rd is used with numbers ending in 3 (e.g. 33rd, pronounced thirty-third)
 As an exception to the above rules, numbers ending with 11, 12, and 13 use -th (e.g. 11th, pronounced eleventh, 112th, pronounced one hundred [and] th)
 -th is used for all other numbers (e.g. 9th, pronounced ninth).
 One archaic variant uses a singular -d for numbers ending in 2 or 3 (e.g. 92d or 33d)

In 19th-century handwriting, these terminals were often elevated, that is to say written as superscripts (e.g. ). With the gradual introduction of the typewriter in the late 19th century, it became common to write them on the baseline in typewritten texts, 
and this usage even became recommended in certain 20th-century style guides.
Thus, the 17th edition of The Chicago Manual of Style states: "The letters in ordinal numbers should not appear as superscripts (e.g., 122nd not )", as do the Bluebook and style guides by the Council of Science Editors, Microsoft, and Yahoo. Two problems are that superscripts are used "most often in citations" and are "tiny and hard to read". Some word processors format ordinal indicators as superscripts by default (e.g. Microsoft Word). Style guide author Jack Lynch (Rutgers) recommends turning off automatic superscripting of ordinals in Microsoft Word, because "no professionally printed books use superscripts".

French 
French uses the ordinal indicators ,  in feminine,  . French also uses the indicator  for the variant ; in feminine this indicator becomes : .

These indicators use superscript formatting whenever it is available.

Catalan 
The rule in Catalan is to follow the number with the last letter in the singular and the last two letters in the plural.  Most numbers follow the pattern exemplified by  '20', but the first few ordinals are irregular, affecting the abbreviations of the masculine forms. Superscripting is not standard.

Dutch 
Unlike other Germanic languages, Dutch is similar to English in this respect: the French layout with  used to be popular, but the recent spelling changes now prescribe the suffix . Optionally  and  may be used, but this is more complex:  (),  (),  (),  ()...

Finnish 
In Finnish orthography, when the numeral is followed by its head noun (which indicates the grammatical case of the ordinal), it is sufficient to write a period or full stop after the numeral:  'In the competition, I finished in 2nd place'. However, if the head noun is omitted, the ordinal indicator takes the form of a morphological suffix, which is attached to the numeral with a colon.

The system becomes rather complicated when the ordinal needs to be inflected, as the ordinal suffix is adjusted according to the case ending:  (nominative case, which has no ending),  (genitive case with ending ),  (partitive case with ending ),  (inessive case with ending ),  (illative case with ending ), etc. Even native speakers sometimes find it difficult to exactly identify the ordinal suffix, as its borders with the word stem and the case ending may appear blurred. In such cases it may be preferable to write the ordinal word entirely with letters and particularly  is rare even in the nominative case, as it is not significantly shorter than the full word .

Irish 
Numerals from 3 up form their ordinals uniformly by adding the suffix : , etc. When the ordinal is written out, the suffix adheres to the spelling restrictions imposed by the broad/slender difference in consonants and is written  after slender consonants; but when written as numbers, only the suffix itself is written. In the case of 4, the final syllable is syncopated before the suffix, and in the case of 9, 20, and 1000, the final vowel is assimilated into the suffix.

Exceptions are 20 and 40, both of whom form their ordinals by adding the suffix directly to the cardinal ( and ).

As in French, the vigesimal system is widely used, particularly in people's ages.  – 95.

The numbers 1 and 2 both have two separate ordinals: one regularly formed by adding , and one suppletive form. The regular forms are restricted in their usage to actual numeric contexts, when counting. The latter are also used in counting, especially , but are used in broader, more abstract senses of 'first' and 'second' (or 'other').

Russian 

One or two letters of the spelled-out numeral are appended to it (either after a hyphen or, rarely, in superscript). The rule is to take the minimal number of letters that include at least one consonant phoneme.

Swedish 

The reason is that  and  respectively end the ordinal number words. When indicating dates, suffixes are never used. Examples:  ('first grade (in elementary school)'),  ('third edition'), but . Furthermore, suffixes can be left out if the number obviously is an ordinal number, example:  ('3rd ed'). Using a full stop as an ordinal indicator is considered archaic, but still occurs in military contexts. Example:  (5th company).

Representation as prefix

Numbers in Malay and Indonesian are preceded by the ordinal prefix ; for example, 'seventh'.

In Chinese and Japanese, an ordinal number is prefixed by   / ; for example,  'first',  'second'.

See also
 Numero sign
 Superior letter

References

External links
 .
 Windows keyboard layouts
 Apple keyboard layouts

 
Typographical symbols